Eduard Vasilyevich Son (born 18 September 1964) is a retired Soviet and Kazakhstani professional football player of Korean ethnic origin. He lives in France.

Honours
 Soviet Top League champion: 1988.
 Soviet Top League runner-up: 1989.
 Soviet Cup winner: 1989.
 USSR Super Cup winner: 1989.
 USSR Federation Cup winner: 1989.
 USSR Federation Cup finalist: 1990.

European club competitions
With FC Dnipro Dnipropetrovsk.
 1988–89 UEFA Cup: 2 games.
 1989–90 European Cup: 5 games, 3 goals.
 1990–91 UEFA Cup: 2 games.

External links
 Career summary by KLISF

1964 births
Living people
Sportspeople from Karaganda
Soviet footballers
Soviet expatriate footballers
Kazakhstani footballers
Kazakhstani expatriate footballers
Kazakhstani people of Korean descent
Expatriate footballers in France
Soviet expatriate sportspeople in France
Kazakhstani expatriate sportspeople in France
Soviet Top League players
Ligue 2 players
FC Kairat players
FC Dnipro players
Gazélec Ajaccio players
Koryo-saram
Soviet people of Korean descent
Association football forwards
FC Iskra Smolensk players